Kantamanenivari Gudem is a small village situated in Guntupalli Panchayat of Kamavarapukota mandal of West Godavari district.

Villages in West Godavari district